Be My Girl may refer to:

 Be My Girl (Jim Dale song), 1957: written by Artie Singer; produced by George Martin; with instrumental accompaniment and directed by Ron Goodwin
 "Be My Girl" (The Dramatics song), 1976
 "Be My Girl" (New Kids on the Block song), 1986
 "Be My Girl" (Eamon song), 2017